In Greek mythology, Myrmidon ( or ; , Murmidónos) was the eponymous ancestor of the Myrmidons in one version of the myth.

Family
Myrmidon was the son of Zeus and Eurymedusa, daughter of Cleitor (Cletor) or of the river god Achelous.

He married Peisidice, daughter of Aeolus and Enarete, and by her became the father of Antiphus and Actor. Also given as his sons were Erysichthon and Dioplethes, father of Perieres, although Erysichthon and Perieres have been ascribed with different parentage. Also, Myrmidon had two daughters: Eupolemeia (mother of the Argonaut Aethalides by Hermes) and Hiscilla (mother of Phorbas by Triopas).

Mythology 
Zeus was said to have approached Eurymedusa in the form of an ant (Greek μύρμηξ, myrmēx), which was where her son's name came from; others say that Myrmex was the name of Eurymedusa's mortal husband, and that it was his shape that Zeus assumed to approach her.

Notes

References

Primary sources 
 Apollonius Rhodius, Argonautica translated by Robert Cooper Seaton (1853–1915), R. C. Loeb Classical Library Volume 001. London, William Heinemann Ltd, 1912. Online version at the Topos Text Project.
 Apollonius Rhodius, Argonautica. George W. Mooney. London. Longmans, Green. 1912. Greek text available at the Perseus Digital Library.
Athenaeus of Naucratis, The Deipnosophists or Banquet of the Learned. London. Henry G. Bohn, York Street, Covent Garden. 1854. Online version at the Perseus Digital Library.
Athenaeus of Naucratis, Deipnosophistae. Kaibel. In Aedibus B.G. Teubneri. Lipsiae. 1887. Greek text available at the Perseus Digital Library.
 Claudius Aelianus, Varia Historia translated by Thomas Stanley (d.1700) edition of 1665. Online version at the Topos Text Project.
Claudius Aelianus, Claudii Aeliani de natura animalium libri xvii, varia historia, epistolae, fragmenta, Vol 2. Rudolf Hercher. In Aedibus B.G. Teubneri. Lipsiae. 1866. Greek text available at the Perseus Digital Library. 
Clement of Alexandria, Recognitions from Ante-Nicene Library Volume 8, translated by Smith, Rev. Thomas. T. & T. Clark, Edinburgh. 1867. Online version at theio.com
 Hyginus, Astronomica from The Myths of Hyginus translated and edited by Mary Grant. University of Kansas Publications in Humanistic Studies. Online version at the Topos Text Project.
 Hyginus, Fabulae from The Myths of Hyginus translated and edited by Mary Grant. University of Kansas Publications in Humanistic Studies. Online version at the Topos Text Project.
 Pseudo-Apollodorus, The Library with an English Translation by Sir James George Frazer, F.B.A., F.R.S. in 2 Volumes, Cambridge, MA, Harvard University Press; London, William Heinemann Ltd. 1921. . Online version at the Perseus Digital Library. Greek text available from the same website.

Secondary sources 
Realencyclopädie der Classischen Altertumswissenschaft, Band XVI, Halbband 31, Molatzes-Myssi (1933), s. 1107 (German)

Myrmidons
Children of Zeus
Demigods in classical mythology
Thessalian characters in Greek mythology
Thessalian mythology